The Sir G B Hunter Memorial Hospital is a health facility at Wallsend Green, Wallsend, Tyne and Wear, England. It is managed by Cumbria, Northumberland, Tyne and Wear NHS Foundation Trust.

History
The facility has its origins in a private house, known as Wallsend Hall, built in the early 19th century. The hall was originally occupied by William Clark, then by his son-in-law, John Wright, who were both Mayors of Wallsend, and then by Robert Richardson Dees, a local solicitor, before being acquired by Sir George Burton Hunter in 1914. Burton presented the hall and its grounds to Wallsend Corporation in 1919. The site was developed as a hospital in the 1920s and extended to the east in the 1940s to create the current health centre. The hospital joined the National Health Service in 1948. The hall itself was re-designated for municipal use in the 1950s.

References

Hospitals established in 1919
1919 establishments in England
Hospitals in Tyne and Wear
NHS hospitals in England